Los Alamos is a census-designated place in Los Alamos County, New Mexico, United States, that is recognized as the development and creation place of the atomic bomb—the primary objective of the Manhattan Project by Los Alamos National Laboratory during World War II. The town is located on four mesas of the Pajarito Plateau, and had a population of about 13,200 as of 2020. It is the county seat and one of two population centers in the county known as census-designated places (CDPs); the other is White Rock.

History

The ruins of permanent Puebloan settlements, such as those located in nearby Bandelier National Monument and Tsankawi, and numerous other sites such as cliff dwellings indicate that the area has been inhabited during various eras since around 1150 AD. The first settlers on the plateau are thought to be Keres speaking Native Americans around the 10th century. Around 1300, Tewa settlers immigrated from the Four Corners Region and built large cities but were driven out within 50 years by Navajo and Apache raids and by drought.

In the late 19th century, homesteaders utilized the land for ranching. Most homesteaders built simple log cabins that they only lived in during warm weather to feed livestock. Many of the homesteaders later moved down to the warmer Rio Grande Valley. In 1917, homesteader Harold H. Brook sold part of his land and buildings to Ashley Pond II, a businessman from Detroit who founded the Los Alamos Ranch School. The area was used to teach young men basic ranching and other outdoor survival skills.

In 1943, during World War II, the United States Department of War exercised eminent domain over the Ranch School and all remaining homesteads in the area so that the relatively isolated location could be used for the secretive Manhattan Project, which ultimately developed the world's first nuclear weapons. Facilities for research and development were quickly built and scientists and engineers from all over the world were assigned to the project, however all information about the town and project was held secretively away from public awareness. Los Alamos was referred to under the code name "Site Y" by military personnel, and was known only as "The Hill" by many in nearby Santa Fe. The specific location of the project and all of its residents was also concealed by designating its mailing address as PO Box 1663, Santa Fe, NM. All incoming truckloads were falsely labeled as common items in order to conceal the true nature of their contents, and any outbound correspondence by those working and living in Los Alamos was censored by military officials. Not until after the bombing of Hiroshima was information about the purpose of the Manhattan Project released to the public.

In the years after World War II, the laboratory was established as a research government facility under the Department of Energy, and is now known as Los Alamos National Laboratory.

Etymology
Los Alamos is a Spanish place name that typically refers to poplar or cottonwood trees. Alternatively, Los Alamos could refer to the large groves of aspen trees that intersperse the coniferous forest on the mountainsides above the townsite, where they are distinctly visible during the autumn months due to their spectacular autumn colors.

Geography

The Los Alamos Townsite and White Rock are located on flat mesa tops separated by steep canyons. This location was chosen for its relative inaccessibility to help protect the secret activities of the Manhattan Project.

The town of Los Alamos was built on four mesas—Barranca Mesa, North Mesa, Los Alamos Mesa and South Mesa—along with the connecting communities at the base of the mountain. Los Alamos National Laboratory occupies half of South Mesa, Two Mile Mesa, Frijoles Mesa, Mesita de Buey and several nearby areas in the region (in the valleys and at the base of the mountain). White Rock lies at the top of White Rock Canyon.

Much of Los Alamos County is within the Española Ranger District of the Santa Fe National Forest.

Climate
Los Alamos has a humid continental climate (Dfb) with four distinct seasons. Summer days are moderately warm in the 70s and 80s, but reach 90 on only 5 days per year on average.

Wildlife and vegetation
Los Alamos' geographical location causes its wildlife and vegetation to be diverse compared to surrounding areas in the state. "The variation in elevation creates precipitation and temperature gradients that support a wide diversity of plant communities..." There are six different plant communities within the county; each is home to unique flora and fauna.
Ponderosa pine trees are the most common trees at the elevation of Los Alamos. Common shrubs in the area include sagebrush, Gambel oak, and wild rose.

Black bears (brown-color variation), elk, mule deer, bobcats, gray foxes, skunks and chipmunks are examples of mammals living in the area.
"Over 200 species of birds have been reported" in the Pajarito Ornithological Survey conducted by LANL.
Among these are broad-tailed hummingbirds, hairy woodpeckers, zone-tailed hawks, common ravens, western bluebirds, and great horned owls.

Wildfires
Wildfires have affected the county, but the most destructive to the townsite was the Cerro Grande Fire of May 2000, which caused an estimated $1 billion in damages and destroyed more than 400 homes. The town was evacuated for eight days. The Federal Emergency Management Agency (FEMA) built temporary housing on North Mesa for those who were displaced by the fire. Though there was no loss of life, other effects include damage to LANL facilities (nuclear material was not affected), flash-flooding, and erosion. 

The Las Conchas Fire of June 26, 2011 burned about three times as many acres and also prompted evacuation of Los Alamos, but there was no damage to property in Los Alamos. It was the biggest wildfire New Mexico had endured.

Wildfires have altered plant communities in the area. Plant species are migrating to cover burn areas.

Environmental remediation
Over two thousand sites in the area have been determined to have been impacted as a result of past activities at LANL. The location of these sites have been identified throughout the county, and are primarily (but not exclusively) on DOE property. Contaminated sites vary widely in significance. Corrective action and environmental restoration has been deemed necessary for certain areas; LANL takes part in this process. Some residents have voiced concern about a lack of public participation and opportunity to comment on the cleanup schedule and funding.

Demographics
The median age is 40 years. 24.8% of the people are under the age of 18, 4.8% are ages 18 to 24, 29.2% are ages 25 to 44, 28.2% are ages 45 to 64, and 12.9% are ages 65 years or older. For every 100 females, there were 101.3 males.

Race

Los Alamos is demographically unique compared to its surrounding counties and the state as a whole. Over 35% of the population of surrounding counties (Rio Arriba, Santa Fe, and Sandoval) and the state of New Mexico are Hispanic or Latino, while only about 15% of Los Alamosans are Hispanic or Latino. The white and especially the Asian populations of Los Alamos are significantly higher than the rest of New Mexico.

Culture

Notable people

Manhattan Project
 Harold Agnew, physicist and third director of Los Alamos National Laboratory (1970-1979)
 Luis Alvarez, nuclear physicist
 Robert Bacher, nuclear physicist
 Hans Bethe, German-American nuclear physicist, awarded 1967 Nobel Prize in Physics
 Norris Bradbury, physicist and second director of Los Alamos National Laboratory (1945-1970). He remained in Los Alamos for the rest of his life.
 James Chadwick, British physicist and recipient of the 1935 Nobel Prize in Physics for discovery of the neutron.
 Charles Critchfield, mathematical physicist. Returned to Los Alamos in 1961 and remained there for the rest of his life.
 Harry Daghlian, physicist, died from radiation poisoning at Los Alamos in September 1945.
 Enrico Fermi, Italian-American theoretical and experimental physicist, has been called “architect of the nuclear age.”
 Val Fitch, nuclear physicist and recipient of the 1980 Nobel Prize in Physics.
 Richard Feynman, theoretical physicist, awarded 1965 Nobel Prize in Physics, shared with Sin-Itiro Tomonaga and Julian Schwinger
 Klaus Fuchs, German theoretical physicist and later atomic spy who supplied information to the Soviet Union.
 George Kistiakowsky, chemist and designer of shaped implosive charges. He was also an avid skier who used implosive rings to fell trees for development of the Sawyer’s Hill ski area near Los Alamos.
 Joseph Laws McKibben, physicist and engineer; designer of the air muscle. Remained in Los Alamos for the rest of his life.
 Edwin McMillan, physicist and recipient of the 1951 Nobel Prize in Chemistry.
 J. Robert Oppenheimer, theoretical physicist and first director of the Los Alamos Laboratory.
 Deak Parsons, Navy Captain (later Rear Admiral); Robert Oppenheimer’s second in command.
 Frederick Reines, theoretical physicist, awarded 1995 Nobel Prize in Physics
 Bruno Rossi, Italian-American experimental physicist, who developed diagnostic instruments for development of the atomic bomb.
 Emilio Segre, Italian physicist and recipient of the 1959 Nobel Prize in Physics.
 Louis Slotin, physicist and chemist; died from radiation poisoning at Los Alamos in May 1946.
 Edward Teller, Hungarian-American theoretical physicist sometimes called “father of the hydrogen bomb.”
 James L. Tuck, British physicist specializing in shaped charges. Returned to Los Alamos 1949-1972, researching thermonuclear fusion for power generation, for which he developed the Perhapsatron
 Stanislaw Ulam, Polish-American mathematician. Remained a consultant with LANL for many years after the Manhattan Project, with a home in nearby Santa Fe for the rest of his life.
 Robert R. Wilson, physicist and a developer of the cyclotron.

1945 onwards
 George Irving Bell, physicist, biophysicist, mountaineer—worked at Los Alamos
Irene Beyerlein, materials scientist, born in Los Alamos, and J. R. Oppenheimer Fellow at the Los Alamos National Laboratory
 Sterling Foster Black, lawyer and state senator.
 Judy Blume, author of many books for children and adults, lived in Los Alamos from 1975 to 1978 and set her novel Tiger Eyes there
 Clayborne Carson, civil rights activist and professor of history at Stanford University, grew up in Los Alamos
 Susann Cokal, award-winning writer, attended junior and senior high school in Los Alamos
 Stirling Colgate, physicist, worked at Los Alamos, member of the last graduating class from the Los Alamos Ranch School
 Michael Creutz, physicist, born in Los Alamos
 Kolinda Grabar-Kitarović, former president of Croatia (2015-2020); graduated from Los Alamos High School in 1986
 Brooke Green, member of the Idaho House of Representatives
 Michelle Lujan Grisham, current governor of New Mexico and former U.S. congresswoman, born in Los Alamos
 Ed Grothus, machinist and technician at LANL, later peace and anti-nuclear activist and proprietor of the Los Alamos Sales Company, known as "The Black Hole"
 Kevin R. Johnson, chief executive officer (CEO) of Starbucks Coffee Company; graduated from Los Alamos High School in 1978

Sports and recreation 
The geography of Los Alamos lends itself to several sports and recreational activities. There is an extensive system of trails within the canyons and into the mountains above the town, catering to all skill levels of running, hiking and mountain biking. The Aquatic Center is an indoor, Olympic-length public swimming pool (soon to be joined by a lazy river), and a public 18-hole golf course (par 72, 6500 yards) has existed since 1947.

Winter sports include skiing at the community-owned Pajarito Mountain Ski Area on 10,440 ft. Pajarito Mountain between November and April. The County maintains New Mexico's only refrigerated, NHL regulation, outdoor ice skating rink on the sun-shaded floor of Los Alamos Canyon, almost beneath the Omega Bridge. Snowshoeing and cross-country skiing are possible at Valles Caldera National Preserve and other locations, weather permitting.

Los Alamos is host to several sporting events:
 Tour de Los Alamos (road cycling race)
 Run the Caldera Marathon
 Pajarito Punishment (mountain-biking race)
 Los Alamos Triathlon (Los Alamos Junior Triathlon)
 Jemez Mountain Trail Run

On November 10, 2015, the National Park Service and the U.S. Department of Energy announced the establishment of Manhattan Project National Historical Park in Los Alamos, along with units in Hanford, Washington and Oak Ridge, Tennessee.

Education
Los Alamos Public Schools provides public Kindergarten through High School education (5 elementary schools, 1 middle school, and 1 high school: Los Alamos High School). The graduation rate, as of March 6, 2021, is 99.3%, in comparison to New Mexico's 76.9% rate and America's average rate of 85%.

The University of New Mexico also has a branch campus in Los Alamos.

Economy
Los Alamos is the fifth-fastest-growing city in New Mexico, after Albuquerque, Rio Rancho, Las Cruces, and Ruidoso.

Income and poverty
The median household income in Los Alamos is $98,458, and per capita income is $54,067. Income is significantly higher than the rest of New Mexico. Los Alamos has the highest millionaire concentration of any US city, with 12.4 percent of households having at least $1 million in assets. This is a result of chemists, engineers, and physicists working at LANL since the Manhattan Project. Only 6.6% of people are below the poverty line; one-third the rate of New Mexico. As of January 2015, there were zero homeless individuals.

Families and housing
There are 5,249 households and an average household size of 2.23 people. There are 5,863 housing units, and the median value of owner-occupied housing units is $281,500. Median gross rent is $921.

31.4% of households have children under the age of 18 living with them, 56.4% are married couples living together, 6.5% have a female householder with no husband present, and 34.0% are non-families. 29.8% of all households are made up of individuals, and 7.6% have someone living alone who is 65 years of age or older.

Principal employers
Los Alamos National Laboratory is the area's largest employer with approximately 10,500 employees, and is foundational to the economy of Los Alamos, with an annual budget of about $2.45 billion. Approximately 40% of the laboratory's employees live in Los Alamos, while the remainder commute from Santa Fe, Española, Taos, and Albuquerque. About 66% of the people who work in the national laboratories commute daily to the lab; some take the Atomic City Transit, Rail Runner Express, use the Park and Ride, or carpool with other employees.

Other major employers in Los Alamos include Smith's Food and Drug, Los Alamos National Bank, Los Alamos Medical Center, Los Alamos County, Los Alamos Public Schools, and Del Norte Credit Union.

Transportation
Los Alamos provides several transportation services:

Roads
Los Alamos is relatively isolated, and can only be accessed from NM 4 from the south and NM 502 from the east.

NM 502 sees significantly more traffic because it connects with US 84/285, which delivers access to several Pueblo communities between Española and Santa Fe. Approximately 10,000 commuters use NM 502 daily. NM 502 begins at Pojoaque, and traverses San Ildefonso Pueblo and the Rio Grande.

Interstate 25 is the nearest major interstate highway, and passes through or near Santa Fe, Albuquerque and Denver.

There are three access roads between White Rock and Los Alamos—Main Hill Road, Jemez Road and Pajarito Road. Since the attacks of September 11, 2001, Pajarito Road has been restricted to LANL badge holders for security reasons.

Transit systems
 Atomic City Transit
 New Mexico Department of Transportation (NMDOT) Park-and-Ride
 New Mexico Rail Runner Express, from its nearest station at Santa Fe.

Air
Los Alamos County Airport, located on the eastern edge of Los Alamos, is the only airport in the county. The main source of activity is from small private aircraft, with intermittent commercial commuter service.

Albuquerque International Sunport is a 100 mile drive south of Los Alamos, and serves most national destinations.

Health care
The 47-bed acute-care facility known as Los Alamos Medical Center is the only hospital in Los Alamos and is a LifePoint Health hospital. The hospital provides "complete medical, surgical, obstetrical, pediatric, emergency, and diagnostic services" and employs about 300 Northern New Mexicans.

Medical Associates of Northern New Mexico (MANNM) is a group of medical providers that offers family medicine, internal medicine, cardiology, nephrology, radiology, and endocrinology among its many services.

During the Cold War, workers at LANL were in contact with radiation and other toxins, causing many of these individuals illness. A non-profit organization called Cold War Patriots provides these individuals and their families with information about the healthcare benefits available to them.

VLBA node
The radio telescope located in Los Alamos is one of ten dishes composing the Very Long Baseline Array (VLBA).

City and regional partnerships

Sister city
Los Alamos maintains sister city status with:
  Sarov (Nizhny Novgorod Oblast, Russia)

Coworking
In June 2016 a collaboration was initiated between the County of Los Alamos, the Los Alamos Commerce & Development Corporation and the Los Alamos National Laboratory's Feynman Center for Innovation and Community Relations and Partnerships Office, to open a private, non-profit coworking space called ProjectY cowork Los Alamos, which helped create educational programs and resources for entrepreneurs and remote workers.

See also
 Bradbury Science Museum
 Casa Mesita

References

External links

 Los Alamos County website
 Los Alamos Chamber of Commerce
 Los Alamos Historical Society
 Bandelier National Monument
 h2g2 article on Los Alamos, New Mexico
 Los Alamos-Sarov Sister Cities website
 

 
Census-designated places in New Mexico
County seats in New Mexico
Jemez Mountains
Manhattan Project sites
Planned cities in the United States
Census-designated places in Los Alamos County, New Mexico